Cedwyn Scott (born 6 December 1998) is an English professional footballer who plays for National League side Notts County as a forward.

After beginning his career with the youth team of Huddersfield Town, he played in Scotland for Dundee, Berwick Rangers and Forfar Athletic, before returning to England where he played in non-League with Dunston UTS and Hebburn Town. He returned to professional football in January 2021 with Carlisle United.

Career
Born in Hexham, Scott moved from Huddersfield Town to Scottish club Dundee in January 2018.

He made his senior debut on 28 April 2018. Scott started the 2018–19 season on loan to Berwick Rangers, scoring four goals in eight games. In February 2019, it was announced that he had joined Forfar Athletic on loan until the end of the season.

At the end of the 2018–19 season, Scott was released by Dundee. During summer 2019, he had a trial at Darlington, playing in several pre-season games. He later signed for Dunston UTS. Scott signed for Hebburn Town on a free transfer in January 2020. In early November 2020, Scott was given a four-week trial at Newcastle United. During the trial, Scott will train with Newcastle's under-23 side but remain available to play for Hebburn. The trial was unsuccessful, and in December 2020 he went on trial with League Two club Carlisle United. He signed a short-term contract with Carlisle United in January 2021, until the end of the 2020–21 season.

He signed for Gateshead in May 2021, scoring twice on his debut against Kettering Town in the opening game of the season. Scott was awarded the National League North Player of the Month award for March 2022 after scoring four goals in five matches across the month to take his tally to 22 goals for the season.

In June 2022, Scott signed for Notts County for an undisclosed fee on a two-year deal.

Career statistics

Honours
Gateshead
National League North: 2021–22

Individual
National League North Team of the Year: 2021–22
National League North Player of the Month: March 2022

References

1998 births
Living people
English footballers
Footballers from Northumberland
Huddersfield Town A.F.C. players
Dundee F.C. players
Berwick Rangers F.C. players
Forfar Athletic F.C. players
Dunston UTS F.C. players
Hebburn Town F.C. players
Carlisle United F.C. players
Gateshead F.C. players
Notts County F.C. players
Scottish Professional Football League players
Northern Premier League players
Northern Football League players
English Football League players
National League (English football) players
Association football forwards